Peninsula Boulevard is a major  arterial road through southwestern Nassau County, New York. It runs southwest-to-northeast between Cedarhurst connecting the Five Towns area to the Village of Hempstead, and indirectly serves The Rockaways as well. 

For its entire length, Peninsula Boulevard is maintained by the Nassau County Department of Public Works as the unsigned County Route 2 (CR 2).

Route description

Peninsula Boulevard (CR 2) 
Peninsula Boulevard begins in Cedarhurst at Rockaway Turnpike (CR 257), near a connecting road to New York Route 878 (Nassau Expressway), and runs through the Five Towns area, where it spends much of its journey running northeast and southwest as a four-lane undivided thoroughfare. In Hewlett, it becomes a divided highway at Franklin Street and then runs beneath a bridge for the Far Rockaway Branch of the Long Island Rail Road between Mill Road and Gibson Boulevard. After Gibson Boulevard, the divider becomes wider as it winds towards Rockaway Avenue, only to return to its former stature. Within Lynbrook, New York, the road takes a sharp northern trajectory after the intersection with New York State Route 27 (Sunrise Highway) and almost immediately runs beneath Lynbrook (LIRR station). The road returns to the northeast at South Niemann Avenue and then intersects Merrick Road. 

After Ocean Avenue, it runs as a divided roadway along the southeastern edge of Hempstead Lake State Park. This divided portion was the original route of the Southern State Parkway before the parkway's current route was constructed across Hempstead Lake. Between Lakeview Avenue and the Southern State Parkway, it contains residential frontage roads on the east side, and pedestrian bridges over the road, the first being Lakeside Drive, and the second being North Village Avenue. The segment along North Village Avenue was a former segment of the Southern State Parkway. The second of these frontage roads ends at Mercy Hospital on the southeast corner of the interchange with the current Southern State Parkway at Exit 19 in South Hempstead. Beyond the Southern State, the road maintains its status as a divided highway even as it enters Downtown Hempstead, where it briefly turns east as it intersects Franklin, Greenwich, and Henry Streets. It is at the latter where the road turns back to the northeast to serve as the southern terminus of Clinton Street, which leads to Glen Cove Road, then intersects New York State Route 102 (Front Street), and finally terminates at New York State Route 24 (Fulton Street).

Bay Boulevard (CR 2A) 
Bay Boulevard is a short extension of Peninsula Boulevard in Cedarhurst. It runs from an intersection at Rockaway Turnpike (CR 257) to an industrial area just west of Nassau Expressway (NY 878).

Route shields 
Peninsula Boulevard, along with all of the other county routes in Nassau County, became unsigned in the 1970s, when Nassau County officials opted to remove the signs as opposed to allocating the funds for replacing them with new ones that met the latest federal design standards and requirements, as per the federal government's Manual on Uniform Traffic Control Devices.

Major intersections

References

External links
Peninsula Boulevard (AlpsRoads)
Peninsula Boulevard (Greater New York Roads)

Roads on Long Island
Transportation in Nassau County, New York